The Curtiss XF15C-1 is a mixed-propulsion fighter prototype of the 1940s. It was among a number of similar designs ordered by the US Navy before pure-jet aircraft had demonstrated their ability to operate from carriers and the mixed-propulsion designs were abandoned. Only three prototypes were constructed, the first one having crashed in testing while the second was scrapped and the last survives to this day.

Development
By the late 1940s, the United States Navy was interested in the mixed-power concept for its shipborne fighters. Jet engines of that era had very slow throttle response, which presented a safety concern in the case of a missed approach on an aircraft carrier as the aircraft might not be able to throttle up quickly enough to keep flying after leaving the end of the deck. This led to orders for a number of mixed-propulsion fighters, including the FR Fireball.

As such, an order was placed with Curtiss on 7 April 1944 for delivery of three mixed-power aircraft, designated the F15C. Powered by both a 2,100 hp (1,566 kW) Pratt & Whitney R-2800 Double Wasp propeller engine, and an Allis-Chalmers J36 turbojet, the aircraft was in theory the fastest fighter in the US Navy at that time.

Operational history
The first flight of the first prototype was on 27 February 1945, without the turbojet installed. When this was completed in April of the same year, the aircraft flew several mixed-power trials, however on 8 May, it crashed on a landing approach. The second prototype flew for the first time on 9 July, again in 1945, and was soon followed by a third prototype. Both aircraft showed promise, however, by October 1946, the Navy had lost interest in the mixed-power concept and cancelled further development.

Surviving aircraft
XF15C-1
Of the two remaining prototypes of this unusual aircraft, one was scrapped after the World War II, and the other remained in storage until it was released by the US Navy to be a museum piece. It was then located at the Quonset Air Museum in North Kingstown, Rhode Island. A part of the roof has collapsed because of ice and snow in March 2014, and this museum is now closed. The sole survivor is now on static display at the Hickory Aviation Museum, in Hickory, North Carolina.

Specifications

See also

References

Bibliography

External links

 Curtiss XF15C-1 page at Air Enthusiasts Corner
 Curtiss XF15C-1 page at Jets45
 Quonset Air Museum Collections page on the only remaining XF-15C which can be seen by the public

1940s United States fighter aircraft
F15C
Mixed-power aircraft
Aircraft first flown in 1945
Low-wing aircraft
T-tail aircraft